Voodoo is an album by The Sonny Clark Memorial Quartet which was composed of alto saxophonist John Zorn, keyboardist Wayne Horvitz, bassist Ray Drummond and drummer Bobby Previte. The album was released in 1986 on Black Saint Records and featured the group’s arrangements of compositions of hard bop pianist Sonny Clark.

Reception
The Allmusic review by Scott Yanow awarded the album 4½ stars stating, "This unusual album is an unlikely success... Zorn creates fairly boppish solos with occasional hints at more advanced improvising techniques. Worth checking out".

The Rolling Stone review by Steve Futterman said that the album "brings out Zorn's anarchic tendencies... Quartet masterminds Zorn and Wayne Horvitz spit fire, never allowing this heartfelt tribute to get too reverential... Here Zorn sounds like he's having serious fun".

Track listing

All compositions by Sonny Clark
Recorded at Classic Sound, New York on November 25 and 26, 1985

Personnel
John Zorn: alto saxophone
Wayne Horvitz: piano/keyboards
Ray Drummond: bass
Bobby Previte: drums

References

John Zorn albums
Black Saint/Soul Note albums
1986 albums